BGC Stopover Pavilion is a mixed-use development in Bonifacio Global City, Metro Manila, Philippines. It consists of a 16-level 
office tower for business process outsourcing companies and a  retail podium with a 2-level basement parking. It is located on Rizal Drive and 32nd Street close to St. Luke's Medical Center. The development is owned by Fort Bonifacio Development Corporation and is expected to be completed in 2015, with the retail area being fully operational in 2014. It is the company's second BPO tower in Bonifacio Global City, after Bonifacio One Technology Tower. As of 2015, construction on the tower has been complete.

References

Bonifacio Global City
Office buildings in Metro Manila
Office buildings completed in 2015
21st-century architecture in the Philippines